Jay Schwartz (born 1965 in San Diego, California, US) is an American composer living in Europe.

He studied music at Arizona State University, where he graduated in 1989, after which he studied musicology in Tübingen, Germany.

From 1992–1995 he was an assistant for incidental music at the State Theater in Stuttgart, Germany (Staatstheater Stuttgart).

His compositions have been performed in renowned festivals in Europe such as the Biennale di Venezia, the Donaueschinger Musiktage, the International Computer Music Conference, the Ultraschall Festival Berlin, and the Documenta in Kassel, and by renowned orchestras and ensembles, such as the Rai Orchestra Sinfonica Nazionale (Italian National Symphony Orchestra), the Radio Sinfonie Orchester Frankfurt, the Radio Sinfonie Orchester Stuttgart, the Berliner Sinfonie Orchester, the Staatskapelle Weimar, Ensemble Modern, the Neue Vocalsolisten Stuttgart, and the NYYD Ensemble Estonia.
 
In 2000 he received the Bernd-Alois-Zimmermann-Prize for composition from the city of Cologne, Germany.  He is a three-time recipient of the Strobel-Fellowship for electronic music from the Südwestrundfunk.

His works are published and represented by Universal Edition Vienna, London, New York.

Works

Orchestral works
Music for Orchestra III (April 2010) Hessischer Rundfunk, Frankfurt am Main, GermanyMusic for Voices and Orchestra (2008)Music for Orchestra II (2007)Music for Orchestra I (2005)Orchestral Suite, Incidental Music to "Werther:  Sprache der Liebe" (2003)Three Pieces for Orchestra (2001)Instrumental worksMusic for 13 Cellos (2007)Music for Violin, Cello and Piano (2007)Music for Flute (2007)Music for Eight Double Basses (2007)Music for Chamber Ensemble (2006)Music for Four Saxophones (2004)Music for Four Stringed Instruments (2004)Music for 17 Stringed Instruments (2003)Music for 5 Stringed Instruments, Incidental Music to "Werther:  Sprache der Liebe"  (2003)Music for 12 Cellos (2002)Music for 6 Stringed Instruments, Boy Soprano and Harpsichord, Incidental Music to "Triumph der Liebe" (2001)Music for Cello (2000)Music for Piano, Violin and Double Bass (2000)Music for Two Saxophones and Two Double Basses (1998)Music for Five Stringed Instruments (1997)Music for 3 Stringed Instruments and Piano, Incidental Music to "Die Möwe" (2001)Music for Piano (1994)Music for Vibraphone and Electronics (1993)Music for Saxophone and Piano (1992)Vocal worksMusic for Six Voices III  (2008)Music for Six Voices II  (2007)Music for Six Voices I  (2006)Music theater
		Narcissus & Echo, chamber opera  (2003)Sound installationsMusic for Autosonic Gongs I - IX  (2001 - 2007)Music for Electromagnetic Piano (2000)Music for a Bridge (2000)''

External links
Website of the composer
 Jay Schwartz biography and works on the UE website (publisher)
Video of Autosonic Gongs Concert Installation

1965 births
Living people
American male classical composers
American classical composers
21st-century classical composers
20th-century classical composers
21st-century American composers
20th-century American composers
20th-century American male musicians
21st-century American male musicians